Macchiato is an Italian word meaning 'marked' or 'stained', and may refer to:

 Caffè macchiato,  espresso macchiato, espresso coffee with a little milk
 Latte macchiato, steamed milk with a little espresso coffee

Other uses 
 Wey Macchiato, a subcompact luxury crossover SUV